Events in the year 2023 in Cyprus.

Incumbents 

 President: Nicos Anastasiades
 President of the Parliament: Annita Demetriou

Events

Ongoing 
 Cyprus dispute

February 
 5 February – 2023 Cypriot presidential election: A runoff is called for 12 February between Nikos Christodoulides and Andreas Mavroyiannis.
 12 February – Cypriots head to the polls for a run-off vote for president between Nikos Christodoulides and Andreas Mavroyiannis

Scheduled 
 13 May – Cyprus in the Eurovision Song Contest 2023.

Sports 

 26 August 2022 – 4 June 2023: 2022–23 Cypriot First Division
 5 October 2022 – May 2023: 2022–23 Cypriot Cup
 UEFA Euro 2024 qualifying Group A

See also 

 Northern Cyprus

References 

 
2020s in Cyprus
Years of the 21st century in Cyprus
Cyprus
Cyprus
Cyprus